Olive Cotton (11 July 191127 September 2003) was a pioneering Australian modernist photographer of the 1930s and 1940s working in Sydney. Cotton became a national "name" with a retrospective and touring exhibition 50 years later in 1985. A book of her life and work, published by the National Library of Australia, came out in 1995. Cotton captured her childhood friend Max Dupain from the sidelines at photoshoots, e.g. "Fashion shot, Cronulla Sandhills, circa 1937" and made several portraits of him. Dupain was Cotton's first husband.

Early life
Olive Edith Cotton was born on 11 July 1911, the eldest child in an artistic, intellectual family. Her parents, Leo and Florence (née Channon) provided a musical background along with political and social awareness. Her mother was a painter and pianist while Leo was a geologist, who took photographs on Sir Ernest Shackleton's expedition to the Antarctic in 1907. The Cotton family and their five children lived in the then bushland suburb of Hornsby in Sydney's north. An uncle, Frank Cotton was a professor of physiology and her grandfather, Francis Cotton, was a Member of the NSW Legislative Assembly in the first Labor Caucus.

Given a Kodak No.0 Box Brownie camera at the age of 11, Cotton with the help of her father made the home laundry into a darkroom "with the enlarger plugged into the ironing light". Here Cotton processed film and printed her first black and white images. While on holidays with her family at Newport Beach in 1924, Cotton met Max Dupain and they became friends, sharing a passion for photography. The photograph "She-oaks" (1928) was taken at Bungan Beach headland in this period.

Cotton attended the Methodist Ladies' College, Burwood in Sydney from 1921 to 1929, gained a scholarship and went on to complete a B.A. at the University of Sydney in 1933, majoring in English and Mathematics; she also studied music and was an accomplished pianist with a particular fondness for Chopin's Nocturnes.

Photography
Cotton joined The Sydney Camera Circle and the Photographic Society of New South Wales, gaining instruction and encouragement from important photographers such as Harold Cazneaux.

She exhibited her first photograph, "Dusk", at the New South Wales Photographic Society's Interstate Exhibition of 1932. Her contemporaries included Damien Parer, Geoff Powell, the model Jean Lorraine and photographer Olga Sharpe, who frequented the studio.

In Australia during the 1930s clients assumed a man would be the photographer. Cotton wryly referred to herself as "the assistant". However whenever possible Cotton photographed visiting celebrities or interesting objects in the studio, even capturing Dupain working in her piece, "Fashion shot, Cronulla Sandhills, circa 1937" and made portraits of him. The publisher Sydney Ure Smith gave her many commissions, and regarded her as one of the best photographers of the 1930s and 1940s.

The Commonwealth Bank's staff magazine Bank Notes featured Cotton's more non-commercial photographs as illustrations.

Style 
During the 1930s Cotton developed mastery using the 'Pictorial' style of photography popular at the time and also incorporated a very modern style approach. Cotton's photography was personal in feeling with an appreciation of certain qualities of light in the surroundings. From mid-1934 until 1940 she worked as Max Dupain’s assistant in his largely commercial studio in Bond Street, Sydney, where she developed a very personal approach which concentrated on capturing the play of light on inanimate objects and in nature. She would often use her Rolleiflex camera to secure unposed reactions while Max set up the lighting for a portrait. Her style soon became distinguishable from that of other modernist photographers’ of her time.

Signature photographs

Tea cup ballet (1935) was photographed in the studio after Cotton had bought some inexpensive china from Woolworth's to replace the old chipped studio crockery. In it she used a technique of back of the lighting to cast bold shadows towards the viewer to express a dance theme between the shapes of the tea cups, their saucers and their shadows. It was exhibited locally at the time and in the London Salon of Photography in 1935. It has become Cotton's signature image and was acknowledged on a stamp commemorating 150 years of photography in Australia in 1991. Tea cup ballet features on the cover of the book Olive Cotton: Photographer published by the National Library of Australia in 1995.

Shasta Daisies (1937) and The Budapest String Quartet (c. 1937) were included in the Victorian Salon of Photography exhibition of 1937.

Cotton received numerous commissions in 1945, including photographs of winter and spring flowers for Helen Blaxland's book Flowerpieces, which also included some images by Dupain. Sydney Ure Smith was an advocate of her work, and she did many commissions for his various art publications.

Later career 
In 1947, Cotton moved to Cowra, New South Wales, with her family and from 1959 she taught Mathematics at Cowra High School until 1964 when she opened a small photographic studio in the town, taking many portraits, wedding photographs, etc., for people in the surrounding district, where her work became well-known and much appreciated, although she was as yet unknown on the postwar city art scene until 1985.

Personal life 
In 1939 Cotton married her longtime friend Max Dupain. They separated in 1941 and were divorced in 1944.

In mid-1947 Cotton went to live in the bush 35 km from Cowra, New South Wales, with her new husband Ross McInerney. They lived in a tent for the first three years, then moved to a small farm where their two children grew up.

Death
Cotton died on 27 September 2003, aged 92.

Legacy 
The prestigious Olive Cotton Award for Photographic Portraiture was set up in her honour and funded by Cotton's family and held at the Tweed Regional Gallery in New South Wales.

Exhibitions
Among others, her work was shown in the following exhibitions:
1935 London Salon of Photography, London, UK
1937 Victorian Salon of Photography
1938 Commemorative Salon of Photography exhibition held by the Photographic Society of NSW as part of the Australian 150th anniversary celebrations
1938 Group show with the Contemporary Camera Groupe at David Jones Gallery, Sydney
1945 First International Adelaide exhibition organised by the Adelaide Camera Club, Adelaide, South Australia
1946 through 1989: Exhibitions with Creative Vision, Sydney, NSW
1981 Australian Women Photographers 1890-1950 touring exhibition, curated by Jenni Mather, Christine Gillespie and Barbara Hall
1985 Olive Cotton Photographs 1924-1984 retrospective held at the Australian Centre for Photography, Sydney, touring numerous regional galleries in NSW, Victoria and Queensland throughout 1986
1992 Solo exhibition Olive Cotton, Australian Girls Own Gallery, Kingston, Canberra, ACT
1995 Women Hold Up Half The Sky, National Gallery of Australia, Canberra, ACT
1995 In a Certain Light: Clarice Beckett and Olive Cotton, Ivan Dougherty Gallery, Paddington, NSW
1995 Women and Art, Mary Place Gallery, Paddington, NSW
1995 Beyond the Picket Fence: Australian Women's Art in the National Library Collections, National Library of Australia, Canberra, ACT
1996 The Reflecting Eye: Portraits of Australian Visual Artists, National Portrait Gallery, Canberra, ACT
1997 The Studio of Max Dupain, State Library of NSW
2000 Solo exhibition Olive Cotton Retrospective, Art Gallery of NSW, Sydney
2002 Solo exhibition Cotton Tales an exhibition of studio family photographs taken in Cowra
2007 What's in a Face? Aspects of Portrait Photography, Art Gallery of NSW, Sydney
2013 Flatlands: Photography and Everyday Space, Art Gallery of NSW, Sydney.
2015 The Photograph and Australia, Art Gallery of NSW, Sydney

Collections
National Gallery of Australia, Canberra
Art Gallery of New South Wales, Sydney
State Library of New South Wales
Camping trips on Culburra Beach, N.S.W., 1937
Photographs taken for Greta Lofberg, December 1938
Cherry blossom, ca. 1946, photographed by Olive Cotton
Shots of flowers, poppies, ca. 1946, photographed by Olive Cotton
Interview with Olive Cotton, 19 July 1997
National Gallery of Victoria, Melbourne
Waverley City Council Collection, Melbourne
Horsham Regional Art Gallery, Victoria

References

Further reading 

Olive Cotton: Photographer, introduction by Helen Ennis, National Library of Australia, 1995
Olive Cotton: Photographs, exhibition catalogue, Australian Girls Own Gallery, Kingston ACT, 1992
 Helen Ennis, Olive Cotton: A Life in Photography, Fourth Estate, Sydney, 2019

1911 births
2003 deaths
20th-century Australian women artists
20th-century Australian photographers
Australian photographers
Australian women photographers
People educated at MLC School
Artists from Sydney
20th-century women photographers